Ravai Fatiaki (born 1 March 1987) is a Fijian rugby union player who plays for Leicester Tigers in England's Premiership Rugby. He plays as a centre or fly-half.

Biography 
Fatiaki's older brother of Fred, coached the former Assistant Minister for Youth and Sports, Iliesa Delana to a first Gold medal win for Fiji and the Pacific at the 2012 Summer Paralympics.

Along with Iliesa Keresoni, Fatiaki was a member of the 2006 Lelean Memorial School Under 19 Dream Team that won the Fiji Secondary Schools' Rugby Union championship Deans Trophy.

Fatiaki made his international debut for Fiji in 2009 against Japan. He was a member of the Fiji squad for the 2011 Rugby World Cup in New Zealand.

Fatiaki has since joined the British Army playing professional Rugby for the Army and appeared in the starting line up of the 2017 Army v Navy.  On 9 November 2017 Fatiaki was named on the bench for Leicester Tigers in their Anglo-Welsh Cup game against Bath.

References

External links
Oceania Rugby profile
Worcester Warriors profile

1987 births
Living people
Worcester Warriors players
Fijian rugby union players
Rugby union centres
Rugby union fly-halves
Fiji international rugby union players
People educated at Lelean Memorial School
Fijian people of Rotuman descent
Fijian expatriate rugby union players
Expatriate rugby union players in England
Fijian expatriate sportspeople in England
People from Nausori
Leicester Tigers players